The Olympic Stadium of Athens "Spyros Louis" (Olympiakó Stádio Athinon "Spyros Louis") is a sports stadium in Athens, Greece. It is a part of the Athens Olympic Sports Complex and is named after the first modern Olympic marathon gold medalist in 1896, Spyros Louis. The stadium used to host some of the biggest sport clubs in Greece like Panathinaikos, Olympiacos and AEK Athens. The stadium served as the main stadium during the 2004 Summer Olympics.

History
Located in the area of Marousi in Athens, the Olympic Stadium was originally designed in 1980 and built in 1980–1982. It was completed in time to host the 1982 European Championships in Athletics. It was inaugurated by the President of Greece at the time, Konstantinos Karamanlis, on 8 September 1982. One year later, in 1983, OAKA Stadium hosted the 1983 European Cup Final between Hamburger SV and Juventus (1-0). In 1987, the stadium hosted the 1986–87 European Cup Winners' Cup final between Ajax and Lokomotiv Leipzig (1-0). Olympic stadium is an UEFA category four stadium and is the largest stadium in Greece. In 1994, OAKA Stadium hosted their second 1994 UEFA Champions League Final, this time contested between AC Milan and Barcelona (4-0). It also hosted several events of the 1991 Mediterranean Games and the 1997 World Championships in Athletics, sought in order to prove that it was capable of hosting major sporting events after the failure of Athens to win the 1996 Summer Olympics but successfully hosting the 2004 Summer Olympics.

It was extensively renovated in time for the 2004 Summer Olympics and the 2004 Summer Paralympics, including a roof designed by Santiago Calatrava, and innovatively positioned with Enerpac hydraulics. The roof was added atop the sidelines and completed just in time for the opening of the Games. The stadium was then officially re-opened on 30 July 2004. It hosted the athletics events and the football finals at the Olympics and the athletics at the Paralympics. It also hosted the opening ceremony on 13 August 2004, and the closing ceremony on 29 August 2004 along the paralympics ceremonies on 17 and 28 September. In 2007, OAKA Stadium hosted the 2007 UEFA Champions League Final between AC Milan and Liverpool (2-1). The stadium's attendance was reduced to 72,000 for the Olympics, the initial capacity was some 75,000, though only 69,618 seats were made publicly available for the track and field events and slightly more for the football final. The turf system consists of natural grass in modular containers which incorporate irrigation and drainage systems.

Design

Construction
The foundation stone for the Olympic Stadium was laid on 7 January 1980. Its construction was revolutionary and involved the use of a prefabrication method for the 34 sets of pillars supporting the stands (each weighed 600 tons). About 26,000 seats of the lower tier were covered, while the stadium's most striking feature were the four leaning pillars that held its floodlights, each being 62 metres tall. The Athens Olympic Stadium was finally inaugurated in September 1982.

Renovation
The stadium was renovated from 2002 until 2004 adding the famous roof for the 2004 Summer Olympics. The central lawn of O.A.K.A consists of approximately 6.000 plastic capsules inside which thermophile lawn is grown. The capsules are adjoining, their size is 1.2*1.2m and are situated on a flat cement surface of two acres, flanked by two lateral drainage channels. The irrigation of the lawn is achieved by 35 automatically elevated water launchers with the use of programmed irrigation. This system allows the movement of the lawn to an area outside the stadium in order for the surface to be used for different events. Thirty-four entrance gates provide access to the stands. Odd gate numbers (1 to 35) lead to the lower and even numbers (2 to 34) to the upper tier. There are no gates numbered 18 and 36, since the two video-scoreboards are located in their place. Additionally, the stadium features 17 VIP boxes and 3 parking lots. Due to its design, the stadium's tribunes have the ability to empty within 7 minutes.

Competition Area

Roof
Designed by the world-known Spanish architect Santiago Calatrava, the roof cost €130 million. The two giant arcs have a total span of 304m and a maximum height of 72m. The roof has a total weight of 18,700 tons coverering by 5,000 polycarbonate panels which covers an area of 25,000 square metres. The west arc was assembled 72m from its final position and the east 65m - both later slid into place. The roof is designed to withstand winds up to 120 km/h and earthquakes up to magnitude 8.

Transport
Access by:

Car - Exit the city centre to the north via Kifissias Avenue and just follow the road signs to "OAKA". If you come from the Attiki Odos ring road, use exit 11 ("Kifissias - Ol. Stadium").

Bus - Use X14 from Syntagma Square in central Athens. It will take you directly to the Olympic Stadium in at least 30 minutes.

Metro - It is a 25-minute ride from the city centre. Use Line 1 and get off at "Irini" or "Neratziotissa". From there, it is a 10-minute walk from the Olympic Complex to the stadium.

Events

 Michael Jackson was booked to perform on a 75,000 sold-out concert as part of his Dangerous World Tour on 10 October 1992, but due to the singer’s health problems, the show had to be canceled.
The Olympic Stadium has been used as home ground in various times by the three big football clubs of Athens, Olympiacos, Panathinaikos and AEK Athens.
Pink Floyd performed there on 31 May 1989 as part of their A Momentary Lapse of Reason Tour.
It hosted the 2007 UEFA Champions League Final on 23 May between AC Milan and Liverpool, which was won 2–1 by Milan, the 1994 Final between Milan and Barcelona, which was also won by Milan, the 1983 Final, as well as the 1987 UEFA Cup Winners' Cup Final.
The stadium played host to Amnesty International's Human Rights Now! Benefit Concert on 3 October 1988. The show was headlined by Sting and Peter Gabriel and also featured Bruce Springsteen & The E Street Band, Tracy Chapman, Youssou N'Dour, and George Dalaras.
Madonna performed before a sold-out crowd of 75,637 at the stadium on 27 September 2008, as part of her Sticky & Sweet Tour.
U2 performed in front of a crowd of 82,662 during their 360° Tour on 3 September 2010, making it the highest attended concert ever held in Greece.
Pyx Lax performed also in front of a crowd of about 80,000, during their reunion tour on 13 July 2011. It was the highest attended Greek-band-concert.
Bon Jovi performed during their Bon Jovi Live Tour on 20 July 2011. The show was successful and almost sold out.
Red Hot Chili Peppers performed in front of a crowd of about 60,000, as part of their worldwide concert tour on 4 September 2012.
 Lady Gaga performed a show for her world tour, ArtRave: The Artpop Ball, in front of 26,860 people.
 Jehovah’s Witnesses International Conventions 2014 and 2019. Attendees from all over the world.

Concerts

Gallery

See also

 Athens Olympic Sports Complex
 List of music venues

References

External links

Official site
Olympic Stadium (Athens)
Athens Olympic Stadium "Spyros Louis" – Many photos and detailed history Stadia Greece

Sports venues completed in 1982
Football venues in Greece
Athletics (track and field) venues in Greece
Greece
Olympic stadiums
Venues of the 2004 Summer Olympics
Olympic athletics venues
Olympic football venues
Multi-purpose stadiums in Greece
Olympiacos F.C.
Panathinaikos F.C.
AEK Athens F.C.
Stadium
1982 establishments in Greece
Acropolis Rally
Athletics in Athens